Thomas Buberl (born 24 March 1973), is a German businessman who has been the CEO of Axa since 2016.

Early life
Buberl was born on 24 March 1973 in Cologne, Germany. He earned a business degree from WHU – Otto Beisheim School of Management (Germany), an MBA from Lancaster University (UK), and a PhD in economics from the University of St. Gallen (Switzerland).

Career

Axa
In 2012, Buberl joined Axa as chief executive officer of AXA Konzern AG in Germany and became a member of the Axa executive committee. In March 2015, he became CEO of Axa's global health business line and a member of the Axa's management committee.

In January 2016, Buberl was also appointed CEO of the global business line, life & savings. From March to August 2016, he was deputy CEO of Axa Group.

Buberl became CEO and a member of the board of directors in September 2016, when Denis Duverne was made chairman (the two roles were separated when Henri de Castries left the company on this date). Under his leadership, Axa bought XL, for 12.4 billion in 2018 as part of a shift towards casualty and property insurance.

In 2019, Buberl became one of the founding members of the Climate Finance Leadership Initiative (CFLI), a group convened by Michael R. Bloomberg to help facilitate the private financing objectives included in the Paris Agreement.

Other activities

Corporate boards
 IBM, Member of the Board of Directors (since 2020)
 Bertelsmann, Member of the Supervisory Board (since 2018)
 Axa XL, Member of the Board of Directors (since 2018)

Non-profit organizations
 World Economic Forum (WEF), Member of the Board of Trustees (since 2020)
 Bertelsmann Stiftung, Member of the Board of Trustees (2015-2018)
 Baden-Badener Unternehmer-Gespräche (BBUG), Member of the Board of Trustees
 Bocconi University, Member of the International Advisory Council
 Free Democratic Party (FDP), Member of the Business Forum
 Geneva Association, Member of the Board of Directors
 Institute of International Finance (IFF), Member of the Board

Recognition
In 2008, Buberl was named a “Young Global Leader” by the World Economic Forum. In July 2019, he became a Knight of the French Legion of Honor.

References

External links
 The Macron generation shakes up French business, Financial Times, 29 July 2017

1973 births
German chief executives
Living people
Businesspeople from Cologne
Axa people